The EMD FP7 is a , B-B dual-service passenger and freight-hauling diesel locomotive produced between June 1949 and December 1953 by General Motors' Electro-Motive Division and General Motors Diesel. Final assembly was at GM-EMD's La Grange, Illinois plant, excepting locomotives destined for Canada, in which case final assembly was at GMD's plant in London, Ontario. The FP7 was essentially EMD's F7A locomotive extended by four feet to give greater water capacity for the steam generator for heating passenger trains.

Design 
While EMD's E-units were successful passenger engines, their A1A-A1A wheel arrangement made them less useful in mountainous terrain. Several railroads had tried EMD's F3 in passenger service, but there was insufficient water capacity in an A-unit fitted with dynamic brakes. The Atchison, Topeka and Santa Fe Railway's solution was to replace the steam generators in A-units with a water tank, and so only fitted steam generators into the B-units. The Northern Pacific Railway's solution was to fit extra water tanks into the first baggage car, and to pipe the water to the engines. EMD's solution to the problem was to add the stretched FP7 to its catalog increasing the water storage capacity.

A total of 381 cab-equipped lead A units were built; unlike the freight series, no cabless booster B units were sold. Regular F7B units were sometimes used with FP7 A units, since they, lacking cabs, had more room for water and steam generators. The FP7 and its successor, the FP9, were offshoots of GM-EMD's highly successful F-unit series of cab unit freight diesel locomotives.

F3s, F7s, and F9s equipped for passenger service are not FP-series locomotives, which, although similar in appearance, have distinctive differences. This includes, but not limited to, the greater body length. The extra  of length was added behind the first body-side porthole, and can be recognised by the greater distance between that porthole and the first small carbody filter grille. The corresponding space beneath the body, behind the front truck, was also opened up; this either remained an empty space or was filled with a distinctive water tank shaped like a barrel mounted transversely.

Over their production run, there were numerous detail changes including the style of side grills (notably on Canadian-built units), carbody louvres, and dynamic brake fan sizing ( initially,  on later production units). Some railroads such as Southern Pacific and Canadian Pacific outfitted their units with rooftop-mounted icicle breakers for protecting dome car windows in mountain territory where icicles formed around the roofs of tunnels.

Original buyers

Locomotives built by EMD at La Grange, Illinois

Locomotives built by GMD at London, Ontario

Preserved examples 

Alaska Railroad 1510 and 1512, used by the Verde Canyon Railroad in Clarkdale, Arizona, on its excursion train.
Chicago Great Western Railway 116-A, on display, at Hub City Heritage Railroad Museum, Oelwein, Iowa.
Canadian Pacific Railway 4038, at Minnedosa, MB.
Canadian Pacific Railway 4069, in working condition and in use at the West Coast Railway Heritage Park; see West Coast Railway Association.
Canadian Pacific Railway 4071, renumbered as Western Maryland Railway 243, in working condition and in use at the Durbin and Greenbrier Valley Railroad.
Canadian Pacific Railway 4099 was later renumbered 1400.  After a stint with Via Rail and Nebkota, it was reacquired by CP and given the number 1400 again.  It was retired again in 2007 and is preserved on static display at the company's Ogden headquarters, as CP 1400.
Clinchfield Railroad 200, renumbered as Western Maryland Railway 67, in working condition and in use at the Durbin and Greenbrier Valley Railroad. It was previously used on the Potomac Eagle Scenic Railroad.
Milwaukee Road 96C, in Monon livery, inoperable at the former Indiana Transportation Museum in Noblesville, Indiana. As of September 10, 2019, the locomotive is up for final auction and will be scrapped if not auctioned off by September 11.
Milwaukee Road 101A, on static display (was non-operational when acquired but reportedly restored by volunteers to operable condition) in Cresco, Iowa.
Milwaukee Road 104C, at the Illinois Railway Museum, Union, Illinois.
Reading 900, at the Reading Railroad Heritage Museum in Hamburg, Pennsylvania
Reading 902, on display at Steamtown National Historic Site in Scranton, Pennsylvania.
Reading 903, also on display at Steamtown.
Soo Line 500A (né EMD demonstrator #9051), on display at Ladysmith, Wisconsin.
Soo Line 2500A (né EMD demonstrator #7001), restored to working condition, at Lake Superior Railroad Museum, Duluth, Minnesota.
Southern Railway (CNO&TP) 6133, in working condition at the North Carolina Transportation Museum at Spencer, North Carolina.
Southern Railway (CNO&TP) 6143 and 6147, in working condition and in use at the Stone Mountain Park at Atlanta.
Southern Railway (CNO&TP) 6141 and 6138 as R J Corman 1940–1941 in use by the Kentucky Dinner Train operation out of Bardstown, Kentucky.
Western Pacific 805-A, a locomotive used on the famous California Zephyr, is preserved in operable condition at the Western Pacific Railroad Museum at Portola, California.

See also 

List of GM-EMD locomotives
List of GMD Locomotives

References

Notes

Bibliography 
 
 
 
 
 
 
 
 
 
 
 
 
 EMD Product Reference Data Card dated January 1, 1959 has the 567BC and 567C engine data used in the as-built roster.

External links 

B-B locomotives
F07P
F07P
Passenger locomotives
Diesel-electric locomotives of the United States
Railway locomotives introduced in 1949
Standard gauge locomotives of Canada
Diesel-electric locomotives of Canada
Diesel-electric locomotives of Saudi Arabia
Standard gauge locomotives of the United States
Standard gauge locomotives of Mexico
Standard gauge locomotives of Saudi Arabia
Diesel-electric locomotives of Mexico
Streamlined diesel locomotives